Somen Chanda (24 May 1920 – 8 March 1942) was a Marxist activist, writer and trade union leader of Bengal.

Early life
Somen Chanda was born in Narsingdi District, British India in 1920. In 1936 he passed Entrance examination from Pogose School and entered in medical school attached with Mitford hospital in Dacca. He was attracted to marxist politics and trade union movement in student life.

Literary works
Chanda joined in Progressive Writers' Association or Pragati Lekhak Sangha and anti fascist activism in Dhaka. He wrote his first novel Banya while he was 17. He wrote number of short stories, drama and articles in their literary journals which were collectively published posthumously. His stories were translated in many languages.

Death
While leading a rally of workers of East Bengal Railway organised by the Soviet Suhrid Samity in Dhaka, Chanda was attacked by some hooligans and killed brutally on 8 March. 1942.

References

1920 births
1942 deaths
Anti-imperialism
Assassinated Indian politicians
Modernist writers
Bengali writers
People from Narsingdi District
Bengali-language writers
20th-century Indian short story writers
Pogose School alumni